Rina Dhaka is an Indian fashion designer.

Early life 
Dhaka graduated from the Government College for Girls in Chandigarh. After her family moved to Delhi, her father enrolled her in a fashion design course. When she was 18, she interned at garment exporter Intercraft. She started her fashion line at Rohit Khosla's atelier.

Career 
Dhaka started in the fashion industry in the 80s, and in the 1990s, she designed churidar made from spandex.  In 2009, she was part of a group of designers who created female beachwear, which was criticized as not being appropriate for use in India. In July 2010, she launched a collection inspired by cobwebs and featured by Indian actress Lara Dutta. In 2012, Dhaka revamped menus and menu cards, uniforms, and store interiors for the Indian coffee shop chain Barista Lavazza. In 2018, Rina Dhaka was mentor for students in the JD Institute of Fashion Technology. In 2019, she collaborated with a Plus Size Store, aLL, and launched a collection for maternity wear. In 2020, Rina collaborated with sustainable manufacturer LIVA for the collection Sustainable Romanticism. In 2021, Rina partnered with Ruma Devu for featuring a tribal fashion show.

Dhaka's designs have been worn by celebrities such as Naomi Campbell, Uma Thurman, or Lara Dutta. Her looks has been exhibited at The Louvre and The Metropolitan.

Rina has worked for an NGO in Delhi ensuring ration is distributed. She is a buddhist practitioner and has used Buddhism's principles to change the way she deals with people.

Celebrity designer Rina Dhaka is shown as herself in the Bollywood film Sandeep Aur Pinky Faraar. She is an ardent believer in sustainable development and while the ambassador of People for the Ethical Treatment of Animals (PETA) India, she advocated for laws and governance against animal cruelty.

Awards 
Dhaka won the Yuva Ratan award in 1993. In 2004, Dhaka won the Best Designer award at Miami Fashion Week.  She has also received the titles of Best Women Entrepreneur in 2014 by the state government of Delhi in the presence of the former chief minister of Delhi: Mrs Sheila Dikshit. In 2015, for Indian Bridal Fashion Week, she has given a chance to upcoming star Akshara Haasan , who made her Bollywood debut with Shamitabh.

She received the Rajiv Gandhi Excellence Award in 2017..Rina unveiled the 'explorer spring summer' in 2018, where Bollywood actor Nidhhi Agerwal walked the ramp as the showstopper for her.
In 2019, was an honorary member of the Bharat conclave celebrating the 150th birth of Mahatma Gandhi posthumously in London.. Also, she opened up the 11th India Runway Week while being honoured by Indian Federation for Fashion Development.

References 

https://elle.in/designer-labels-vacation-plans/?fbclid=PAAabjPruRtjmn_gTfr3qfq8ThqUQFjUDVTnWlUFV2XinWoWP8tNFVrnb58JI

https://m.timesofindia.com/life-style/spotlight/whats-your-new-year-resolution-for-2023/articleshow/96653311.cms?fbclid=PAAaZrB3Tkc-isOkocYJbHZ4BjstXa7enqxvSi_wA85B2fNQ5BZmK3GMW-NJ4

https://timesofindia.indiatimes.com/life-style/fashion/shows/kangana-ranaut-brings-khadi-glam-to-the-delhi-ramp/articleshow/90449247.cms

https://m.timesofindia.com/life-style/spotlight/whats-your-new-year-resolution-for-2023/articleshow/96653311.cms?fbclid=PAAaZrB3Tkc-isOkocYJbHZ4BjstXa7enqxvSi_wA85B2fNQ5BZmK3GMW-NJ4

https://www.popxo.com/article/sakshi-sindwani-interview/

https://timesofindia.indiatimes.com/life-style/fashion/shows/a-glam-kickstart-to-the-three-day-fashion-extravaganza/articleshow/91695978.cms

https://photogallery.indiatimes.com/fashion/indian-shows/indore-times-fashion-week-2022-day-3-rina-dhaka/articleshow/94743554.cms

https://photogallery.indiatimes.com/fashion/indian-shows/chandigarh-times-fashion-week-2022-day-2-rina-dhaka/articleshow/95270088.cms

https://www.freepressjournal.in/lifestyle/rina-dhaka-who-presents-her-latest-collection-today-at-fdci-x-lakme-fashion-week-talks-about-her-designs-and-inspiration

https://in.fashionnetwork.com/news/Khadi-showcase-features-six-designers-at-fdci-lakme-fashion-week,1390767.html

External links
 Official website

Indian women fashion designers
Year of birth missing (living people)
Living people